Claude Flemming (1884–1952) was an Australian actor, writer, producer and director of theatre and film whose varied stage career spanned the first half of the 20th century. He performed in Shakespeare and other drama, as well as opera, and became a music comedy specialist.

Biography
Flemming was born in Camden, New South Wales. He made his stage début for George Rignold's Shakespeare company in Sydney in 1903. Soon afterwards, in England, he appeared on tour with Herbert Beerbohm Tree's Company and then performed in grand opera at Covent Garden (Die Meistersinger, The Angelus). He later played in Edwardian musical comedy and operetta in the West End, including in Fallen Fairies (1909) and in New York. During and after the First World War, he toured in his homeland with the J. C. Williamson company in such musicals and operettas as The Chocolate Soldier, The Maid of the Mountains, A Southern Maid, The Firefly, The Cousin from Nowhere, Sybil and Lilac Time.

He acted and directed in several silent films in 1917 and 1918. Later, in America, he had a stint as a voice coach in Hollywood during the early years of sound films and as a company director for Efftee Studios. He directed The Magic Shoes (1935), the first screen performance of Peter Finch. He also worked as supervisor of productions at radio station 2CH in Sydney.

His last stage work in Australia was as Col. Buffalo Bill in the Australian premiere in Melbourne, and subsequent three-year tour, of Annie Get Your Gun from 1947–50.

Selected filmography
 The Test (1916)
Trilby (1917) – actor
The Lure of the Bush (1918) – director, actor
£500 Reward (1918) – director, actor, producer, writer
 The Sword of Damocles (1920) – actor
Captain of the Guard (1930) - actor
Too Many Wives (1933) - actor
Dear Old London (1933) (short) – director
Sheepmates (1934) (uncompleted film) – actor
The Magic Shoes (1935) (short) – director

References

External links

1884 births
1952 deaths
Australian film producers
Australian film directors
Male actors from New South Wales
Australian expatriate male actors in the United Kingdom
Australian expatriate male actors in the United States